The Customhouse and Post Office in Georgetown, Washington, D.C., was completed in 1858 in a Renaissance Revival–Italian Palace style. Construction cost was $55,468. The first floor was occupied by a branch post office and the second floor by the Customs Service. It was listed on the National Register of Historic Places in 1971.  It was already included as a contributing building within the Georgetown Historic District.

It was designed during 1856–57 by Ammi B. Young (1798–1874), who was Supervising Architect of the United States Treasury. On June 23, 1967, the customhouse moved from its 31st Street location to a new building at 3180 Bladensburg Road, N.E., Washington, D.C. A small branch post office remains on the first floor.

It has a low seamed-metal roof.

Gallery

See also 
List of United States post offices
National Register of Historic Places listings in western Washington, D.C.

References

External links

Renaissance Revival architecture in Washington, D.C.
Government buildings completed in 1857
Custom houses in the United States
Government buildings on the National Register of Historic Places in Washington, D.C.
Post office buildings on the National Register of Historic Places in Washington, D.C.
Georgetown (Washington, D.C.)
Custom houses on the National Register of Historic Places
1858 establishments in Washington, D.C.